Norma Jean Wright (born July 15, 1956) is an American singer and was the lead vocalist of the American group Chic, a soul, R&B and disco band, from 1977 to 1978.

Early life
Norma Jean Wright was born in Ripley, Tennessee. At young age, she relocated to Elyria, Ohio, with her family. She attended Ohio State University.

Career
Wright sang in the female trio, the Topettes, and toured for a short time with The Spinners. In 1977, she joined Chic, a soul, R&B and disco band.

Most notably, she sang lead vocal on Chic's debut album, Chic (1977), which includes the hits "Dance, Dance, Dance (Yowsah, Yowsah, Yowsah)" (#6 Pop, #6 R&B in January 1978) and "Everybody Dance" (#38 Pop, #12 R&B in April 1978).

She left Chic in 1978 to begin a solo career, billed as Norma Jean. In July 1978, she scored her first R&B Top 20 hit, "Saturday" (#15), from her debut album, Norma Jean on the Bearsville Records label, produced by Bernard Edwards and Nile Rodgers. In January 1980, she scored her second (and last) R&B Top 20 hit, "High Society" (#19), also produced by the Chic team.

Her first album included several popular songs: "Sorcerer", "Having a Party", and "I Like Love." Later popular songs were "Hold Me Lonely Boy" (1979), "Love Attack" (1983), "Shot in the Dark" (1984), and "Every Bit of This Love" (1985). In 2004, "I Like Love" was sampled by the British dance project Solitaire for their club hit "I Like Love (I Love Love)."

Wright has sung as a backing vocalist with C+C Music Factory, Constina, Randy Crawford, Will Downing, Aretha Franklin, Fantasy, Debbie Gibson, Nelson Rangell, Luther Vandross, Madonna, Sister Sledge, Nick Scotti & Freddie Jackson. She frequently appears in a duo with Luci Martin, another former Chic vocalist. In 2018, Wright joined and toured with the female group First Ladies of Disco. In March 2019, Wright released the single "Don't Stop Me Now" with the group.

In 2019, she received The Culture News Award for Lifetime Achievement by David Serero.

Discography 
 Norma Jean (1978)

References

External links
 chictribute.com

Living people
20th-century African-American women singers
American dance musicians
American disco musicians
American rhythm and blues singers
American soul musicians
Chic (band) members
People from Elyria, Ohio
Ohio State University alumni
Bearsville Records artists
1956 births
21st-century African-American people
21st-century African-American women